The 2004 Swedish Golf Tour, titled as the 2004 Telia Tour for sponsorship reasons, was the 21st season of the Swedish Golf Tour.

Most tournaments also featured on the 2004 Nordic Golf League.

Schedule
The following table lists official events during the 2004 season.

Order of Merit
The Order of Merit was based on prize money won during the season, calculated using a points-based system.

See also
2004 Danish Golf Tour
2004 Finnish Tour
2004 Swedish Golf Tour (women)

Notes

References

Swedish Golf Tour
Swedish Golf Tour